St Richard's Catholic College, or St Richard's, is a secondary school in East Sussex in the United Kingdom. It is a voluntary aided school, maintained by East Sussex County Council. The school is situated in the Roman Catholic Diocese of Arundel and Brighton. St Richard's was rated 'outstanding' by Ofsted in 2006, a rating that it sustained following an interim assessment in 2010. Of the school community, HM Inspectorate commented, 'The social, moral, spiritual and cultural development of students is outstanding'. St Richard's also scored a Level 1 (the highest rating) in each section of its 2018 Denominational Inspection Report.

History

St Richard's Catholic College was opened in 1959. Its construction was funded, in part, by fundraising within the local Roman Catholic community. For example, in July 1958, just under £1000 was raised by Catholics in Eastbourne for the Diocesan education fund.

When it was first opened, the college was known as St Richard's Catholic School; it was named after St Richard of Chichester (1197 – 1253), who visited Bexhill during his lifetime. It is probable that St Richard built the manor house at Manor Barn, found in the ancient centre of Bexhill-on-Sea, the ruins of which are still visible today.

The raison d'être of St Richard's Catholic School was to offer a denominational secondary education for the local Catholic population. Hitherto, there had been several Catholic primary schools in the area (e.g. St Mary Star of the Sea in Hastings and St Joseph's in Eastbourne), though there had been no sufficient provision for Catholic children over the age of eleven. As a result, St Joseph's in Eastbourne was severely overcrowded. The school had to take infants, juniors and seniors, despite that 'the buildings [were] totally inadequate to house all these groups for education'. St Joseph's has since closed and been replaced by St Thomas, a Becket Catholic Primary School.

St Richard's was, and remains, the only Catholic secondary school in East Sussex (the nearest alternatives being in Brighton and Tunbridge Wells). It has always had a substantial catchment area, traditionally ranging from Eastbourne, through Bexhill, to the vicinity of the Hastings area.

At the time of the school's construction, transporting children into Bexhill proved controversial within Eastbourne's town council. Indeed, a series of contemporary newspaper articles from the Eastbourne Gazette and Eastbourne Herald reveal the contention that surrounded the payment of the future pupils' train fares.

It was suggested in February 1958 that, when the school was built, Eastbourne's council should subsidise half the cost of Eastbourne pupils travelling into Bexhill. In March, however, the council's Education Committee voted by a majority of eight to six to cover the whole cost of pupils' fares. This decision followed a letter from the archdiocesan secretary responsible for education (at his time, Eastbourne and Bexhill both fell within an archdiocese–the Archdiocese of Southwark–as Arundel and Brighton had yet to be created). Yet, this was not the end of the episode. On 1 April, Eastbourne council's Finance Committee urged the main chamber to reconsider their U-turn. Concerned over the cost to ratepayers, the Finance Committee argued the council should only pay for half of pupils' fares. Travel for a single child would have cost 2s6d a week.

Finally, on 8 April, the council agreed with the Finance Committee and voted by a majority of twenty to five to subsidise only half of any future pupils' fares. Another vote, which passed by fourteen to eleven, allowed for families in 'hardship' to claim for a 100 p/c subsidy on rail fares. This proved controversial as some interpreted the vote to contradict contemporary directives issued by the Ministry of Education (whereby full fares, in that instance, could be paid). It was feared that many local Catholics simply could not afford the cost–and that many would be too proud to go 'cap in hand' to the council and plead 'hardship'. Some believed the decision was reached because of the denominational nature of the new school. Indeed, the council paid for the entire fares of other pupils travelling similar distances.

So, prior to the elections of May, the same year, local Cannon J J Curtin took the issue to the pulpit at Sunday Mass: "It would be a good if all Catholics," he said, "when canvassed for their votes [...] satisfied themselves that candidates would, if elected, endeavour to get the decision of Eastbourne Council to pay only half of the fare for pupils to the new Catholic school in Bexhill rescinded." Further action was taken by the local church in October. Archdiocesan representatives wrote to the relevant Ministry, complaining about the legality of the council's decision. However, after a legal review by the town clerk, the decision to pay for half fares was kept. The council held out on the issue. In its early years, St. Richard's Catholic School existed largely in the shadow of the local grammar (now Bexhill High Academy). This was because St Richard's offered placements based on faith rather than on intelligence. It is for this reason that St Richard's continues to have a higher than average proportion of pupils for whom English is a second language. However, following the Cessation of Grant Regulations 1975, which saw the conversion of many grammar schools across the country, the playing field between St Richard's and Bexhill High (as it was known) was to a level.

The school's reputation has increased since the late 1980s, largely because of the accession of Anthony Campbell OBE to the position of Headmaster. After a series of reforms under Campbell, St Richard's became the forerunning state school in East Sussex. It still frequently comes first in the county league tables for both results and Progress 8. Campbell's achievements were recognised in the 2007 New Year's Honours List, wherein he received an OBE for 'services to education'. Campbell retired in 2008; his retirement mass and celebrations were recorded in the local paper.

The role of headmaster has since been taken over by Doreen Cronin, under whom the school has continued to flourish and attain excellent results. Under her tenure, GCSE results (the highest qualification offered at the school, save for an AS in Religious Studies) have remained well above average. In 2018, the first year that the new grade 1 – 9 GCSEs were sitting, 83 p/c of pupils achieved a grade 4 or above in English and Maths. This is well above the National and the County averages (National 68 p/c).

Spiritual life 

The college has a Spiritual Life Team who promotes and co-ordinating liturgical activities throughout the year, and supporting the spiritual journeys of students and staff.

Local priests lead assemblies and school masses on special occasions and Days of Holy Obligation. Year group Masses and form Masses are celebrated by the priests of both Deaneries on a rota basis. Pupils at St. Richard are provided the opportunity to receive the Sacrament of Reconciliation.

The prayer of St Richard (attributed to the Saint himself) is often recited at college:

"Thanks be to thee, my Lord Jesus Christ, for all the benefits Thou hast given to me, and for all the pains and insults Thou hast bourn for me. Most merciful redeemer, friend and brother, may I know Thee more clearly, love Thee more dearly, and follow Thee more nearly. Amen."

The prayer has been adapted to music and forms the school hymn, which is sung on special occasions.

House System 
There are four houses at St Richard's Catholic College: Rigby, Wells, Gwynne and Howard (red, yellow, green and blue, respectively). Each house is named after an English martyr from around the time of the reformation. Apart from Saint Philip Howard, each of the martyrs for which the houses are named was canonised by Pope Paul VI in 1970. The former three are each one of the Forty Martyrs of England and Wales.

The houses are not a central part of life at St Richard's. They become important on Sports Day, held in the summer term.

Rigby 
Saint John Rigby was (ca.1570 – 21 June 1600) from Eccleston, near Chorley, Lancashire. He was the fifth or sixth son of Nicholas Rigby, by his wife Mary (née Breres).

In 1600, Rigby was working for Sir Edmund Huddleston. Sir Edmund sent him to the sessions house of the Old Bailey to plead illness for the absence of his daughter, the widow Mrs Fortescue, who had been summoned on a charge of recusancy. A commissioner then questioned Rigby about his own religious beliefs. Rigby acknowledged he was Catholic and was thus sent to Newgate.

The next day, the feast day of St Valentine, he signed a confession saying that since he had been reconciled to the Roman Catholic faith by Saint John Jones, a Franciscan priest, he had not attended Anglican services. Over the course of his imprisonment, Rigby was twice was given the chance to recant, but he twice refused.

As such, Rigby was sentenced to death by hanging, drawing and quartering. He gave his executioner a piece of gold, saying, "Take this in token that I freely forgive thee and others that have been accessory to my death." Rigby was executed at St Thomas Waterings. Cut down too soon, he landed on his feet, but was thrown down and held while he was disembowelled. According to Challoner, "The people, going away, complained very much of the barbarity of the execution."

Wells 
Saint Swithun Wells was born at Brambridge House, Hampshire in 1536, of a wealthy country family, and was christened with the name of the local saint and bishop Swithun. He was the youngest of the five or six sons of Thomas Wells of Brambridge, by Mary, daughter of John Mompesson. During the Reformation, his family contributed to the secret funerals of Catholics at the local cemetery, and their house was a place of refuge for priests. Wells was well-educated, a poet, musician, and sportsman. Among his travels, he had been to Rome, and had a working knowledge of Italian.

In June 1586, he was arrested with seminarians Alexander Rawlins and Christopher Dryland and imprisoned in Newgate, but was released 4 July when his nephew posted bail. On 9 August 1586, he was examined for supposed complicity in the Babington Plot, and on 30 November 1586, he was discharged from the Fleet prison. At one point, he went to Rome on a mission for the Earl of Southampton, but he returned to England to work in the English Catholic underground. He was again examined 5 March 1587, and on this occasion speaks of the well-known recusant, George Cotton of Warblington, Hampshire, as his cousin.

In 1591, Edmund Gennings was saying Mass at Wells's house, when the priest-hunter Richard Topcliffe burst in with his officers. The congregation, not wishing the Mass to be interrupted, held the door and beat back the officers until the service was finished, after which they all surrendered peacefully. Wells was not present, but his wife was she and Gennings were arrested along with another priest by the name of Polydore Plasden, and three laymen named John Mason, Sidney Hodgson, and Brian Lacey. Wells was immediately arrested and imprisoned on his return. He was charged under the 1585 Act Against Jesuits, Seminary Priests and Other Such Disobedient Subjects. At his trial, he said that he had not been present at the Mass, but wished he had been.

Wells was sentenced to die by hanging, and a gibbet was erected outside his own house on 10 December 1591. On his way to the scaffold, Swithun caught sight of an old friend in the crowd and said to him, "Goodbye my dear. Goodbye to our nice hunting companies. Now I have something much more important to do." Wells was buried in St. Andrew's Churchyard in Holborn.

Gwynne 
Saint Richard Gwyn (ca. 1537 – 15 October 1584), also known by his anglicised name, Richard White, was a Welsh school teacher. He was martyred by being hanged, drawn and quartered for high treason in 1584. His feast day is celebrated on 17 October.

Gwyn was a Catholic during the reign of Elizabeth I, under whom it was illegal to adhere to any faith but Protestantism. Gwyn often had to change his home and his school to avoid fines and imprisonment. Finally, in 1579, he was arrested by the Vicar of Wrexham, a former Catholic who had conformed to Anglicanism. He escaped and remained a fugitive for a year and a half. He was recaptured, and spent the next four years in one prison after another.

In May 1581, Gwyn was taken to church in Wrexham, carried around the font on the shoulders of six men and laid in heavy shackles in front of the pulpit. However, he "so stirred his legs that with the noise of his irons the preacher's voice could not be heard." He was placed in the stocks for this incident and was taunted by a local Anglican priest who claimed that the keys of the Church were given no less to him than to St. Peter. "There is this difference", Gwyn replied, "namely, that whereas Peter received the keys to the Kingdom of Heaven, the keys you received were obviously those of the beer cellar."

Gwyn was fined £280 for refusing to attend Anglican church services, and another £140 for "brawling" when they took him there. When asked what payment he could make toward these huge sums, he answered, "Six-pence". Gwyn and two other Catholic prisoners, John Hughes and Robert Morris, were ordered into court in the spring of 1582 where, instead of being tried for an offence, they were given a sermon by an Anglican minister. However, they heckled him (one in Welsh, one in Latin and one in English) if exercise had to be abandoned.

Richard Gwyn, John Hughes, and Robert Morris were indicted for high treason in 1583 and were brought to trial before a panel headed by the Chief Justice of Chester, Sir George Bromley. Witnesses gave evidence that they kept their allegiance to the Catholic Church, including that Gwyn composed "certain rhymes of his own making against married priests and ministers" and "[T]hat he had heard him complain of this world; and secondly, that it would not last long, thirdly, that he hoped to see a better world [this was construed as plotting a revolution]; and, fourthly, that he confessed the Pope's supremacy." The three were also accused of trying to make converts.

Despite their defences and objections to the dubious practices of the court, Gwyn and Hughes were found guilty. At the sentencing Hughes was reprieved and Gwyn condemned to death by hanging, drawing and quartering. This sentence was carried out in the Beast Market in Wrexham on 15 October 1584. Just before Gwyn was hanged, he turned to the crowd and said, "I have been a jesting fellow, and if I have offended any that way, or by my songs, I beseech them for God's sake to forgive me." The hangman pulled on his leg irons, hoping to put him out of his pain. When he appeared dead, they cut him down, but he revived and remained conscious through the disembowelling, until his head was severed. His last words, in Welsh, were reportedly "Iesu, trugarha wrthyf" ("Jesus, have mercy on me").

Howard 
Saint Philip Howard, 20th Earl of Arundel (28 June 1557 – 19 October 1595) was an English nobleman. He was born during the upheaval of the Reformation. His home from the age of seven was a former Carthusian monastery. At fourteen he was married to his stepsister, Anne Dacre. He graduated from St John's College, Cambridge in 1574 and was about eighteen when he attended Queen Elizabeth I's Court. His life had been a frivolous one, both at Cambridge and at Court, where he was a favourite of the Queen.

Philip Howard's father, the Duke of Norfolk, was arrested on 1 October 1569 for his intrigues against Queen Elizabeth. The Duke was attainted and executed in 1572, but Philip Howard succeeded to his mother's inheritance upon the death of his grandfather, becoming Earl of Arundel in 1580. He was present at a debate held in 1581 in the Tower of London, between Father Edmund Campion, a Jesuit, Father Ralph Sherwin and a group of Protestant theologians. He was so impressed by the Catholics that he experienced a spiritual conversion. He renounced his previous, frivolous life and was reconciled with his wife.

Arundel, with much of his family, remained Catholic recusants during the reign of Queen Elizabeth. He was himself suspected of disloyalty, and was regarded by the discontented Roman Catholics as the centre of the plots against the queen's government, and even as a successor.

Howard was committed to the Tower of London on 25 April 1585. He was charged before the Star Chamber with being a Roman Catholic, with quitting England without leaving, sharing in Jesuit plots, and claiming the dukedom of Norfolk. He was sentenced to pay £10,000 and to be imprisoned during the queen's pleasure. In July 1586, his liberty was offered to him if he would carry the sword of state before the queen went to church. In 1588, he was accused of praying, together with other Romanists, for the success of the Spanish Armada. He was tried for high treason on 14 April 1589, found guilty and condemned to death, but his sentence was not executed; Queen Elizabeth never signed the death warrant, but Howard was not told this. He was kept constantly in fear of execution, although comforted by the companionship of a dog, which served as a go-between by which Howard and other prisoners, most notably the priest Robert Southwell, could send messages to each other. Although these two men never met, Howard's dog helped them to deepen their friendship and exchange encouragement in each other's plight.

One day Howard scratched into a wall of his cell these words: Quanto plus afflictiones pro Christo in hoc saeculo, tanto plus gloriae cum Christo in futuro ("the more affliction [we endure] for Christ in this world, the more glory [we shall obtain] with Christ in the next")

Howard spent ten years in the Tower until his death from dysentery. He petitioned the Queen as he lay dying to allow him to see his wife and his son, who had been born after his imprisonment. He was refused. He remained in the Tower, never seeing his wife or daughter again, and died alone on Sunday 19 October 1595. He was immediately acclaimed as a Catholic Martyr.

School Awards
St Richard's has been awarded, by the government, a Leading Edge Status. This means that they have been recognised as an example to others in how they teach. Also St Richard's is a Fairtrade School.

Performance 
In 2018, St Richards was ranked as second in the county for Progress 8 attainment; its rating stands as 'well above average'.

References

External links
School's home page
BBC league tables page

Secondary schools in East Sussex
Catholic secondary schools in the Diocese of Arundel and Brighton
Voluntary aided schools in England
Bexhill-on-Sea